Brian Carroll (born 25 March 1941) is a former Australian rules footballer, who played 10 matches for Fitzroy in 1963.

Family
He is the father of current Collingwood Head of Academy and former Box Hill coach and former Hawthorn assistant coach Damian Carroll.

Football

Saturday, 6 July 1963
On 6 July 1963, playing in the back-pocket, he was a member of the young and inexperienced Fitzroy team that comprehensively and unexpectedly defeated Geelong, 9.13 (67) to 3.13 (31) in the 1963 Miracle Match.

See also
 1963 Miracle Match

Notes

External links

1941 births
Fitzroy Football Club players
Living people
Australian rules footballers from Victoria (Australia)
Camperdown Football Club players